Anish Tejeshwar is an Indian actor who works predominantly in Kannada films. He made a debut with 2010 Kannada film Nam Areal Ond Dina.

Career
Anish first featured on a Hyderabad magazine cover. After taking a film training course, he debuted with the 2010 Kannada film Nam Areal Ond Dina, which released after Police Quarters. He then acted in several films, including Telugu. He was cast in the 2016 film Akira.

Personal life
Anish Tejeshwar lives in Bangalore, Karnataka, India.

Filmography

References

External links
 

Living people
Indian male film actors
Male actors in Kannada cinema
Male actors from Bangalore
Male actors in Telugu cinema
21st-century Indian male actors
Year of birth missing (living people)